One of the defining features of development today is the relationship between education and technology, stimulated by the spectacular growth in internet connectivity and mobile penetration. We live in a connected world. An estimated 40% of the world’s population now uses the internet and this number is growing at a remarkable rate. While there are significant variations in internet connectivity among countries and regions, the number of households with such links in the global South has now overtaken those in the global North. Moreover, over 70% of mobile telephone subscriptions worldwide are now in the global South. Five billion people are expected to go from no to full connectivity within the next twenty years. However, there are still significant gaps among countries and regions, for example between urban and rural areas. Limited broadband speed and lack of connectivity hamper access to knowledge, participation in society and economic development.

The internet has transformed how people access information and knowledge, how they interact, and the direction of public management and business. Digital connectivity holds promise for gains in health, education, communication, leisure and well-being. Artificial intelligence advances, 3D printers, holographic recreation, instant transcription, voice-recognition and gesture-recognition software are only some examples of what is being tested. Digital technologies are reshaping human activity from daily life to international relations, from work to leisure, redefining multiple aspects of our private and public life.

Such technologies have expanded opportunities for freedom of expression and for social, civic and political mobilization, but they also raise important concerns. The availability of personal information in the cyber world, for example, brings up significant issues of privacy and security. New spaces for communication and socialization are transforming what constitutes the idea of ‘social’ and they require enforceable legal and other safeguards to prevent their overuse, abuse and misuse. Examples of such misuse of the internet, mobile technology and social media range from cyber-bullying to criminal activity, even to terrorism. In this new cyber world, educators need to better prepare new generations of ‘digital natives’ to deal with the ethical and social dimensions of not only existing digital technologies but also those yet to be invented. 
Education and internet are interrelated to each other. In pandemic time of 2020 online class are very important for students study for that online class internet has help a lot  we can any information regarding our subject in internet

Education and technology in developing countries

Technology plays an increasingly significant role in improving access to education for people living in impoverished areas and developing countries. Educational technology is not merely a matter of education and technology alone but is also about the societal culture wherein that educational technology is implemented. Charities like One Laptop per Child are dedicated to providing infrastructures through which the disadvantaged may access educational materials.

According to one article, technology in developing countries is mostly limited, but some countries do have new advances in terms of pro-technology policies and biotechnology developments. One position effect of improving technology in developing countries is less dependence of developing countries on developed countries' exports of goods or technology. Developing infrastructures, promoting entrepreneurship, and formulating more open policies to technology are all somewhat effective ways of improving education and economies of developing countries.

The OLPC foundation, a group out of MIT Media Lab and supported by several major corporations, has a stated mission to develop a $100 laptop for delivering educational software. The laptops were widely available as of 2008. They are sold at cost or given away based on donations.

In Africa, the New Partnership for Africa's Development (NEPAD) has launched an "e-school program" to provide all 600,000 primary and high schools with computer equipment, learning materials and internet access within 10 years. An International Development Agency project called nabuur.com, started with the support of former American President Bill Clinton, uses the Internet to allow co-operation by individuals on issues of social development.

India is developing technologies that will pass learning materials directly to its students. In 2004, the Indian Space Research Organisation launched EDUSAT, a communications satellite providing access to educational materials that can reach more of the country's population at a greatly reduced cost.

Educational tech (EdTech), mostly, information and communication technology can address issues, such as, an absent school teacher by conveying better lessons, preparing instructors and motivating students. In this generation, the price of educational technology has fallen to the point where EdTech is easily accessible even in generally poor nations. Tablets cost as low as $28 and India has the least expensive data plans on the planet. With less expensive data plans new companies such as ExtraClass has come into light which aims to provide affordable education to 260 million children.

Effects of Technology on Education 
The key job that innovation needs to play in education is proportional access to a portion of the core tools that can make an important effect in the lives of both instructors and students. Some important themes can be identified to create worldwide techniques to help advancements that match the particular needs of a developing society. Some of the significant topics is to guarantee that students have access to the correct learning material, particularly in their own dialects since it guarantees a better comprehension of subjects.

An AI-based tutoring system was put into an entry-level IT school in Pensacola by the U.S. Navy. This system involves a human tutor who monitors the student's progress while providing individual assessments. According to the Navy, the students that worked with the digital tutoring system consistently performed better on the tests than did the students who did not use the digital tutor. The adaptive technology appears to affect students positively because it can assist individuals that have different learning skills than others and therefore better equipped to learn on their own.

Controversy 
Technologies are being developed to address different challenges in topics such as education, health and global poverty, but there are cases in which this is not working or the results achieved are far away from the expectations. Kentaro Toyama, in his book Geek Heresy mentions examples in which this happen. He highlights the cases of computers in Bangalore that are locked away because teachers don't know what to do with them and mobile phone apps meant to spread hygiene practices and fail to improve health in Africa. Moreover, these past decades there have been huge improvements in technology which have done little to reduce rising poverty and inequalities, even in developed countries like United States. In addition to this, an interesting example is the one found by the economist Ana Santiago and her colleagues at the Inter-American Development Bank which conclude no educational advantage in a One Laptop per Child program in Peru. Another team of researchers found similar results in Uruguay, and concluded: "Our findings confirm that the technology alone cannot impact learning".

References 

Free content from UNESCO
Educational technology